According to the First National Poll on Discrimination (2005) in Mexico which was carried out by the CONAPRED, 48% of the Mexican people interviewed indicated that they would not permit a homosexual to live in their house. 95% of the homosexuals interviewed indicated that in Mexico there is discrimination against them; four out of ten declared they were victim of acts of exclusion; more than half said they felt rejected; and six out of ten felt their worst enemy was society.

Although overall public displays of homosexual affection or cross-dressing are still taboo in most parts of Mexico, LGBT social life tends to thrive in the country's largest cities and resorts.

Population and culture

The visible center of the LGBT community is the Zona Rosa, where over 50 gay bars and dance clubs exist. Surrounding the country's capital, there is a sizable amount in the State of Mexico. Some observers claim that gay life is more developed in Mexico's second largest city, Guadalajara. Other large cities include border city Tijuana, northern city Monterrey, centrist cities Puebla and León, and major port city Veracruz. The popularity of gay tourism, especially in Puerto Vallarta, Cancún, and elsewhere, has also brought more national attention to the presence of homosexuality in Mexico. Among some young, urban heterosexuals, it has become popular to attend gay dance clubs and to have openly gay friends.

In 1979, the country's first LGBT Pride Parade, also known as LGBT Pride March, was held and attended by over one thousand people in Mexico City. Ever since, it has been held every June without interruption under different slogans with the aim of bringing visibility to sexual minorities, encouraging consciousness about AIDS and HIV, denouncing homophobia, and demanding the creation of public policies such as the recognition of same-sex civil unions and same-sex marriages and the legalization of LGBT adoption, among others.

According to organizers, in its latest edition, the XXXI LGBT Pride Parade was attended by over 350,000 people, 100,000 more than its predecessor. In 2003, the first Lesbian Pride March occurred in the country's capital. In Guadalajara, well-attended LGBT Pride Parades have been held also every June since 1996. LGBT Pride Parades have continuously occurred in Monterrey, Tijuana, Puebla, Veracruz, Xalapa, Cuernavaca, Tuxtla Gutiérrez, Acapulco, Chilpancingo, and Mérida.

The Mexican gay soccer team, known as El Tri Gay, is the first of its kind in the country. Team member Eduardo Velázquez was quoted saying,

In 2007, Mexico participated for the first time in the Gay World Cup, which was held in Buenos Aires, Argentina. However, according to team members, they have been discriminated against by Mexican official soccer organizations, such as the Mexican Football Federation (FMF) and the National Commission for Physical Culture and Sports (CONADE), that have refused to support them because the Gay World Cup is not recognized by FIFA. The team also participated in the 2008 Gay World Cup held in London, UK, and in the 2009 World Outgames held in Copenhagen, Denmark. The team fully participated in the AIDS Healthcare Foundation (AHF) "LOVE Condoms Campaign", all getting publicly tested.

One of the gay centers of culture and amusement in Mexico is the Zona Rosa, a series of streets in Colonia Juárez in Mexico City. Since mid-2007, the government of the Federal District and Cuauhtémoc, D.F. — in whose territory the Zona Rosa is found — have placed operatives in some seedy nightclubs of the Zona Rosa, with the purpose of freeing this tourist zone of problems such as illegal drug trade and prostitution, as well as reducing the incidence of crimes such as theft. Other targets of the program are those sites of cohabitation that lack safety measures for the users — mainly emergency exits.  LGBT groups have denounced the action as a form of homophobia.

Economy

The pink peso

The pink market (called "LGBT market", or mercado rosa) in Mexico is calculated at 51,300 million pesos (some US$3,891 million). The group of LGBT consumers, ignored until the present out of homophobia or fear of critics, is being discovered. In 2005 the Gay Expo in Mexico was created, which claimed to know the companies and services of the LGBT community, and the companies of the division have been united into the Union of Companies and Service Providers to the Lesbian, Gay, Bisexual, and Transgender Community (Unegay).

A study by the agency De la Riva on the behavior of the LGBT consumer shows that the habits of gay men and lesbians are distinct. While gay men prefer brand names and a riskier lifestyle, lesbians tend to be educated and don't tend to pay attention to brand names. Gays respond to advertisements that make knowing winks to the community but reject advertisements with openly gay themes because they fear being identified through the product.

Pink tourism, especially from the US, has one of its favorite destinations in Mexico, and especially Puerto Vallarta, where it is even possible to see men taking a walk hand in hand in the Zona Romántica. Another favorite destination is Cancún, which has tried to attract the LGBT public with events like the Cancún Mayan Riviera Gay Fall Fiesta and the Cancún International Gay Festival.  LGBT tourism focuses not on sun, beaches, and Mayan ruins; it is more diverse. For this public there exist two specialized travel agencies, Opta Tours (since 1991) and Babylon Tours.

Tourism

Guadalajara and Acapulco were common vacation destinations for gay men and lesbians from Mexico City and, especially, the United States and Canada in the 1980s and 1990s. Since that time, Puerto Vallarta has developed into Mexico's premier resort town as a sort of satellite gay space for its big sister Guadalajara, much as Fire Island is to New York City and Palm Springs is to Los Angeles.

Puerto Vallarta 
Puerto Vallarta is now considered the most welcoming and gay-friendly destination in the country, dubbed the "San Francisco of Mexico." It boasts a gay scene, centered in the Zona Romántica, of hotels and resorts as well as many bars, nightclubs and a gay beach on the main shore. Puerto Vallarta has been cited as the number one gay beach destination in Latin America.

See also 
 LGBT in Mexico

Footnotes

References

 Peter M. Nardi and Beth E. Schneider. Social perspectives in lesbian and gay studies: a reader. Routledge, 1998. 625 p.  .
 John Middlemist Herrick and Paul H. Stuart. Encyclopedia of social welfare history in North America. SAGE, 2005. 534 p.  .
 Don M. Coerver, Suzanne B. Pasztor, Robert Buffington. Mexico: an encyclopedia of contemporary culture and history. ABC-CLIO, 2004. 621 p. .
 Yolanda C. Padilla. Gay and lesbian rights organizing: community-based strategies. Routledge, 2004. 235 p.  .
 Ben Sifuentes-Jáuregui. Transvestism, masculinity, and Latin America literature: genders share flesh. Palgrave Macmillan, 2002. 240 p. .
 Louis Crompton. Homosexuality & Civilization. Harvard University Press, 2006. 623 p. .
 Wayne R. Dynes, Warren Johansson, William A. Percy, Stephen Donaldson. Encyclopedia of homosexuality, Volume 2. Garland Pub., 1990. 1484 p. .

 George E. Haggerty. Gay histories and cultures: an encyclopedia. Taylor & Francis, 2000. 986 p.  .
 Rudi Bleys. Images of ambiente: homotextuality and Latin American art, 1810-today. Continuum International Publishing Group, 2000. 244 p.  .
 Alfonso G. Jiménez de Sandi Valle, Luis Alberto de la Garza Becerra and Napoleón Glockner Corte. LGBT Pride Parade in Mexico City. National Autonomous University of Mexico (UNAM), 2009. 25 p.
 Andrew A. Reding. Mexico: Update on Treatment of Homosexuals. U.S. Citizenship and Migration Services. May, 2000. 37 p.
 María de Jesús González Pérez. LGBT Pride Parade. Metropolitan Autonomous University - Azcapotzalco. El Cotidiano. May–June, 2005. 90-97 p.

LGBT in Mexico